The Global Professional Wrestling Alliance (GPWA) was a cooperative group of professional wrestling promotions and wrestlers from around the world. Formed in 2006, the group was founded by the professional wrestler Mitsuharu Misawa, the founder of Pro Wrestling Noah. It was led by president Yoshiyuki Nakamura, co-owner of Pro Wrestling Zero1. The organization folded in 2009.

Aims
The group was established as a means to aid the many competing wrestling promotions in Japan. Members would share resources including training facilities and their wrestlers themselves. They would also coordinate the arrangements of their shows in order to avoid clashes. In addition to this "super shows" would be run with wrestlers from the member promotions competing on the same shows, the first of which occurred on November 14, 2006.

Members

Promotions

Freelance wrestlers

See also

Professional wrestling in Japan
List of professional wrestling promotions in Japan

References

External links
Pro Wrestling Noah’s official English website
Pro Wrestling Zero1’s official English website
Ring of Honor’s official website
World League Wrestling’s official website

Japanese professional wrestling promotions
Ring of Honor
2006 establishments in Japan
2009 disestablishments in Japan